Chudzowice  is a village in the administrative district of Gmina Trzebiel, within Żary County, Lubusz Voivodeship, in western Poland, close to the German border.

The village has an approximate population of 100.

References

Chudzowice